South Korea participated as the Republic of Korea at the 2010 Winter Olympics in Vancouver, British Columbia, Canada. This was their best performance at the Winter Olympics to date, ranking 5th in gold medals and 7th in overall medals.

Korea won its first ever medal in figure skating when Kim Yuna won gold and set a world record in the ladies' event.

Medalists

Alpine skiing

Biathlon

Bobsleigh

Cross-country skiing

Figure skating

South Korea qualified 2 entrants in ladies singles, for a total of 2 athletes. Kim Yuna's gold medal at the ladies' event is the South Korea's first medal at the Winter Olympics in an event other than short track and speed skating.

Freestyle skiing

Luge

Short track speed skating

Men

Women

Skeleton

Ski jumping

Snowboarding

Speed skating

Men

Men's team pursuit

Women

Women's team pursuit

See also
 South Korea at the Olympics
 South Korea at the 2010 Winter Paralympics

References

2010 in South Korean sport
Nations at the 2010 Winter Olympics
2010